The  Malbim Synagogue was a synagogue on  4 Strada Bravilor , in Bucharest, Romania. The building was devastated by the far-right Legionaries in 1941. The synagogue was demolished in 1987 to make room for the Union Boulevard.

History 
The synagoge was built in 1864  upon the initiative of head rabbi Meir Leibush Wisser and reconstructed in 1912. The building was named after Rabbi Meir Leibish Malbim (1809-1879), being Chief Rabbi of Bucharest and Romania (1858-1864).

References

Synagogues in Bucharest
Destroyed synagogues
Demolished buildings and structures in Bucharest
Buildings and structures demolished in 1987